A. James Rudin is an American rabbi noted for his work in inter-religious affairs.

He was born in Pittsburgh, Pennsylvania. He is a 1955 graduate of George Washington university Rudin was ordained by the Hebrew Union College-Jewish Institute of Religion in 1960.

He joined the staff of the American Jewish Committee in 1968 and retired in 2000 after serving for many years as 2000 National Interreligious Affairs Director. In January 1987, Rudin was one of several civil rights activists who participated in a large march through Forsyth County, Georgia, as part of civil rights protests in the area.

He was appointed distinguished visiting professor of religion and Judaica at Saint Leo University in 2002.

Awards
 "Person of Reconciliation" Award from the Polish Council of Christians and Jews in Warsaw, 1997
 Joseph Award given by the Villa Nazareth, a Pontifical Institution, 1997
 International Council of Christians and Jews awarded him its Interfaith Medallion, 1999
 Eternal LIght Award, St. Leo University, 2007

Notes

American Reform rabbis
Wesleyan University alumni
American Jewish Committee
Hebrew Union College – Jewish Institute of Religion alumni
Saint Leo University
Living people
Year of birth missing (living people)
21st-century American Jews